Billy Ze Kick is a 1985 French film directed by Gérard Mordillat. Zabou Breitman received a César nomination for Most Promising Actress.

Plot 
Billy Ze Kick is name of a fictional serial killer in a bedtime story that a police inspector reads to his daughter. Soon three girls turn up murdered in his neighbourhood, and the killer leaves a note signed "Billy Ze Kick."

Cast 
Francis Perrin as Inspecteur Chapeau
Dominique Lavanant as Madame Achere
Zabou Breitman as Juliette Chapeau
Marie France as Miss Peggy
Patrice Valota as Eugene
Jacques Pater as Inspecteur Cordier
Pascal Pistacio as Hippo
Cérise Bloc as Julie-Berthe
Michael Lonsdale as Commissaire Bellanger
Yves Robert as Alcide
Benjamin Azenstarck as Ed

References

External links 

1985 films
French crime comedy films
1980s French films